The Thailand competed at the 2013 Summer Universiade in Kazan, Russia from 6 to 17 July 2013. 82 athletes were a part of the Thailand team.

Thailand has won 15 medals (19th place), including 2 gold medals.

Medals by sport

Medalists

References

Nations at the 2013 Summer Universiade
Thailand at the Summer Universiade
2013 in Thai sport